Dillo Day is an annual all-day music festival at Northwestern University that takes place at the end of spring quarter on the Lakefill. Started in the 1972/73 school year, it is organized by Mayfest Productions, a Northwestern student group, and is the largest completely student-run music festival in the country. Northwestern lists Dillo Day as one of its most notable traditions.

History 
The festival has its roots in May Day, or Mayfete. Mayfete was a time when students would celebrate the "renunciation of the May Queen of the temporal world for a spiritual one," according to a 1951 history of the event. Although little is known about the early days, May Day was originally a celebration of the women of Northwestern. The crowning of the May Queen was the central event, and the pomp included a Maypole dance and cotillion. May Day expanded to May Week in 1946 to accommodate a women's sing, men's sing, and an honors ceremony.

Armadillo Productions was created in 1972 by two students from Austin, Texas to honor the official animal of their home state and a concert venue there. They held a “I Don’t Think We’re in Kansas Anymore” festival and fair that had costumes, games, a treasure hunt, and special events. It was held every year until 1976 when it was cancelled due to weather and financial difficulties; but returned the following year as Armadillo Day. That same year, a 10-day assortment of campus programming called Mayfest began, which included Armadillo Day, Greek Week and A&O's Spring Festival. The first outdoor Mayfest concerts were produced by A&O featuring Robert Gordon 5.22.81 and Muddy Waters 5.23.81, staged on one lakefront stage and offered at no cost to students.  Mayfest Productions eventually formed from A&O Productions, solely producing the Saturday concert event on the shores of Lake Michigan that is known today as Dillo Day. Mayfest Productions has earned a reputation for booking major industry artists, and is annually one of the largest and most competitive clubs at Northwestern.

Organization 
The festival features a main stage, second stage, food trucks, beer garden, and Dillo Village that hosts art from students and Chicago-area artists, as well as various other games and activities. Dillo Day is open to all Northwestern University students, faculty, and staff. Students are each permitted to bring one additional guest, and a limited number of tickets are reserved for purchase by Evanston residents and Northwestern alumni. The second stage is curated in partnership with an additional campus organization-- currently Northwestern's Black student alliance, For Members Only, who has provided Dillo Day with a historic all-Black lineup on the stage for the past 3 years. In addition to Dillo Day, beginning in 2016, Mayfest Productions hosted annual Battle of the Bands and eventually Battle of the DJs competitions in the weeks leading up to the festival. The winners of these respective events perform on the main stage of Dillo Day that year.

On May 30th, 2020, Mayfest Productions hosted Digital Dillo, a virtual replacement for the annual music festival due to the COVID-19 pandemic. Those within the Northwestern community received a link to a livestream where they could watch live artist performances and participate in Q&A sessions with them. The following year, Dillo Day was held as a hybrid festival. This once again featured virtual artist performances and live Q&A's, but also had in-person components across campus the entire week of the festival similar to the original Mayfest. This included Mayfeast, a collection of food trucks outside Deering Library; Mayfit, a thrift shopping event at Norris University Center; Dildo Day, a variety of sex/body positivity events; student art installations on the Lakefill where the festival is traditionally held; a silent disco outside Norris featuring Chicago area DJ's; and screenings of artist performances on and off-campus.

Past lineups 

1981
 Robert Gordon
 Muddy Waters

2001

 The Mighty Mighty Bosstones
 Black-Eyed Peas
 Nymb
 Dismemberment Plan
 All Mighty Senators

2002

 Béla Fleck and the Flecktones
 Mystic
 The Slackers
 Jephreee
 The Pages
 Local Age

2003

 Robert Randolph and the Family Band
 The Crystal Method
 Blackalicious
 Steel Train
 Idlewild
 Troubled Hubble

2004

 The Wailers
 Gavin Degraw
 The Pharcyde
 The Ms
 Michael Tolcher

2005

 George Clinton and the Parliament Funkadelics
 The Black Keys
 Matt Nathanson
 Acceptance

2006

 Ben Folds
 Robert Randolph and the Family Band
 Mae
 High End Trio

2007

 Cake
 The Roots
 Lupe Fiasco
 Pete Francis
 Office

2008 
Common
Broken Social Scene
Ted Leo and the Pharmacists
Third Eye Blind
The Cool Kids
A DJ set by Northwestern University alumnus William Butler, member of Arcade Fire
A DJ set by Flosstradamus
Clash Gordon
DJ Sicarii
2009 
N.E.R.D
Estelle
Tally Hall
Mike Posner
The Decemberists

2010 
Regina Spektor
Guster
Practical Tactical
Rhymefest
Super Mash Bros
Nelly

2011 
B.o.B
Chiddy Bang
New Pornographers
N.A.S.A.
Kill the Noise
Guns & Sons
Peter Bjorn and John

2012 
Cold War Kids
Kendrick Lamar
Reel Big Fish
Big Boi
Steve Aoki

2013 
Walk the Moon
Danny Brown
Smash Mouth
Lunice
Wiz Khalifa

2014

Main Stage
Chance The Rapper
2 Chainz
Ryan Hemsworth
OK Go
Cults

WNUR x IndieU Stage
Tink
The GTW
Sirr Tmo
Teen Witch Fan Club
RUNNING

2015 (Note: Dillo Day was canceled in 2015 due to weather)

Main Stage

Charli XCX
Odesza
Miguel
A$AP Ferg
Saint Motel

WNUR Stage

Sicko Mobb
Cakes da Killa
Ben Aqua
Archie Powell & The Exports
K Rizz

2016

Main Stage

 Schoolboy Q
Cashmere Cat
Anderson .Paak & The Free Nationals
The Mowgli's
Hayden James

WNUR Stage

 Derrick Carter
Smino
Mister Wallace
Colleen Green
Akenya

Battle of the Bands Winner

 DIAL UP

2017

Main Stage

 MGMT
Gramatik
Little Simz
DRAM
Porches

WNUR x Nongshim Stage

 Marie Davidson
MikeQ
Downtown Boys
Chynna Rogers
Bunny

Band & DJ winner (respectively)

 Prez Harris & Friends
Onnij x Ouyang

 2018 

 Main Stage 
Young the Giant
TOKiMONSTA
Whitney
Joey Bada$$
Daniel Caesar

 WNUR x Nongshim Stage 
Cupcakke
Dos Santos
Violence
Jasmine Infiniti
Guerilla Toss

 Band & DJ winner (respectively) 
 Wop St. Bass Ritual
EJ3

 2019 

 Main Stage 
 Hippo Campus
 Teyana Taylor
 Anna Lunoe
 Daya
 A$AP Ferg

 FMO Stage 
 Monique Heart
 Kota the Friend
 DFree Da Vinci
 Caleborate
 Amindi

 Band & DJ winner (respectively) 
 FIZZ
 Luminosity

 2020 
Note: due to the COVID-19 pandemic, there were no student acts during the 2020 livestream.

 Main Stage 
 The Regrettes
 Rico Nasty
 Jai Wolf

 FMO Stage 
 Azjah
 Yung Kaygo
 Mir Fontane

 2021 

 Main Stage
Playboi Carti
Ken Car$on
KAYTRANADA
beabadoobee
Omar Apollo

 FMO Stage 
 Blxst
 Brittney Carter
 Brandon Banks

 Band & DJ winner (respectively) 
 Wes Park and the Blueberry Boo Boo Babies
 Sydco (won in 2020)

 2022 

 Main Stage
Dominic Fike
Tinashe
Sean Kingston
Remi Wolf
Cochise (rapper)
Vicetone

 FMO Stage 
Taylor Bennett (rapper)
Kari Faux
Scorey
Jordan Hawkins

 Band, DJ, and Rapper winners (respectively) 
 Poor Man's Yacht Club
 Moondog
 Ciel

References

External links 

groups.northwestern.edu
newmedia.medill.northwestern.edu

Music festivals in Illinois
Northwestern University
1972 establishments in Illinois